Gustave François Lussi (June 2, 1898 – June 23, 1993) was a figure skating coach. His students include many champions, such as Dick Button, Tenley Albright, Maria Jelinek / Otto Jelinek, Donald Jackson, Alena Vrzáňová, Ronald Robertson, Ronald Ludington, Barbara Ann Scott, David Jenkins, Hayes Jenkins, Emmerich Danzer, Dorothy Hamill, John Misha Petkevich, and John Curry.

Personal life 
Lussi was born in Stans, Switzerland. He himself was not a competitive skater but a ski jumper. He lost his nerve for that sport after a fall, and became interested in skating instead. He skated on [[Lake Lucerne.

In 1919, Lussi emigrated to the United States, landing in New York City. He became a U.S. citizen in 1927. In 1932, he married Thelma McDowell, with whom he had two sons. He died on June 23, 1993, at the age of 95.

Coaching career 
Lussi supported another Swiss emigrant, Mr. De Bergen, a skating coach, and himself in New York while learning skating from De Bergen. Considering himself to be "a big gawky fellow", he vowed that "If I cannot be a champion, I shall make them." A few years later, while teaching in Philadelphia as De Bergen's assistant he rebelled against De Bergen's style of skating, started pioneering his own methodology, and left Philadelphia for a while to coach in Canada and Lake Placid.

His first champion student was Egbert S. Carey Jr., who won the U.S. junior men's title in 1924. A little later, he and his student, Montgomery "Bud" Wilson, invented the flip jump. In 1928, Bud Wilson and his sister, Constance Wilson-Samuel, became Lussi's first World Champions. Lussi coached Dick Button from the age of twelve.

Lussi introduced checking the jump landings instead of turning a three after landing, a program as composition with a beginning and ending instead of the official just banging a gong to signal the end of the allotted time to perform, closing the figures at the center which until that time were left open, the original design for the Pattern 99 blade, the flying sit spin, the flying camel or Button Camel spin with Dick Button, the crossed-leg rotation position in jumping and spinning, the double Axel jump, the triple jumps, the delayed Axel and delayed-rotation double and triple jumps.

Lussi also started summer skating in Lake Placid after the Olympic Arena was enclosed in 1932 for the Winter Olympics. He convinced the local municipality to open the arena for a month that summer and imported skaters from Canada to perform shows that summer. His father-in-law painted the ice for these great extravaganzas. These shows led to his being hired to choreograph the shows for Ice Follies for several years.

Legacy
Lussi's skaters are known for their strong spinning technique. Lussi was also responsible for developing modern figure skating jump technique, including the now-standard crossed-leg rotation, or back spin, position in the air. His pupil Dick Button was the first to perform a double Axel and the first triple loop jump in competition, and Lussi students were also the first performers of flying spins such as the flying camel and flying sit spin which are now a standard part of every elite skater's repertoire.

In April 1990, a documentary film Gustave Lussi: The Man Who Changed Skating was shown on the PBS television network. The documentary was conceived and co-produced by his former student Cecily Morrow and produced by station WCFE-TV. Around this time Morrow also worked with Lussi to produce a series of instructional videos, entitled Systematic Figure Skating: The Spin and Jump Techniques of Gustave Lussi, capturing his coaching techniques.

Some of Lussi's other students, such as Carlo Fassi, Ron Ludington, Mary Scotvold, Robin Wagner, and Cecily Morrow have also become successful coaches who have passed on Lussi's techniques to subsequent generations of skaters. Wagner coached Sarah Hughes to the 2002 Olympic title and Sasha Cohen to a World Championship medal.   Lussi was enshrined into the professional Skaters Association Coaches Hall of Fame in 2002.

On December 15, 2015, U.S. Figure Skating announced Lussi would be a member of the U.S. Figure Skating Hall of Fame Class of 2016.

References

 Button, Dick (1955). Dick Button on Skates. Englewood Cliffs, NJ: Prentice-Hall. Catalog Card No. 55-12069.
 www.lussitechnicalvideo.com Systematic Figure Skating:  The Spin & Jump Techniques of Gustave Lussi. (instructional videos produced by a Lussi student, Cecily Morrow)

1898 births
1993 deaths
American figure skating coaches
People from Stans
Sportspeople from Nidwalden
Swiss emigrants to the United States